This is a list of the number-one hits of 1989 on Italian Hit Parade Singles Chart.

References

1989
Number-one hits
Italy